The Chesapeake Warehouses are a complex of eight former tobacco storage facilities at 1100 Dinwiddie Avenue in Richmond, Virginia. These facilities were built c. 1929, and served as storage facilities for a number of the major American tobacco companies. Tobacco was brought into the complex, which originally had fourteen warehouses, by rail, and was delivered to local processing plants by truck. They were in regular use until 1963, when industry practices moved away from the centralized storage of large quantities of tobacco, a practice that resulted in significant losses due to insect infestation. Six of the original warehouses were demolished due to termite infestation.

The complex was listed on the National Register of Historic Places in 2014.

See also
National Register of Historic Places listings in Richmond, Virginia

References

Industrial buildings and structures on the National Register of Historic Places in Virginia
Industrial buildings completed in 1893
Buildings and structures in Richmond, Virginia
National Register of Historic Places in Richmond, Virginia
Warehouses on the National Register of Historic Places
Tobacco buildings in the United States